Raphael Pujazon (12 February 1918 – 22 February 2000) was a French athlete who competed in the 1948 Summer Olympics. He was born in El Campillo, Spain. He won back-to-back titles at the International Cross Country Championships in 1946 to 1947.

References

1918 births
2000 deaths
Sportspeople from the Province of Huelva
French male long-distance runners
French male steeplechase runners
Olympic athletes of France
Athletes (track and field) at the 1948 Summer Olympics
European Athletics Championships medalists
International Cross Country Championships winners